Dalğalı (known as Prorva until 1998) is a village in the municipality of Mikayıllı in the Neftchala District of Azerbaijan.

References 

Populated places in Neftchala District